William Brazier (1755 – 7 October 1829) was an English cricketer of the late 18th century who played mostly for Kent county cricket teams.

He made his first-class cricket debut in 1774, playing for a Kent side against a Hampshire XI at Sevenoaks Vine. He went on to play in a total of 50 first-class matches in a career which lasted until 1794, scoring 1,216 runs and taking at least 42 wickets. He played for Kent sides 28 times, as well as for West Kent and for a combined Kent and Hampshire side. Another eight matches were for England sides and he played once as a given man for a Surrey side in 1776.

Although he played for a left-handed team in 1790, Scores and Biographies says that Brazier was a right-handed batsman who bowled fast and was a powerful hitter. The same source described him as a farmer at Cudham who continued to play village cricket until 1819. He was a "useful all-rounder" who "hit the ball particularly hard" according to Ashley Mote and James Pycroft, writing in 1851, described him as one of Kent's three best players. Brazier died at Cudham in 1829.

Notes

References

English cricketers
Kent cricketers
English cricketers of 1701 to 1786
1755 births
1829 deaths
Surrey cricketers
English cricketers of 1787 to 1825
Left-Handed v Right-Handed cricketers
West Kent cricketers